Paweł Sarna (born January 26, 1977, in Jaworzno, Poland) is a Polish poet. He published his poems in various literary magazines, including Kwartalnik Artystyczny, Studium, Przegląd Artystyczno-Literacki, Tytuł, Undergrunt, and Kursywa.  He lives in Katowice .

Bibliography
 Ten i Tamten Bydgoszcz, Świadectwo 2000, .
 Biały OjczeNasz Kraków, Zielona Sowa 2002, .
 Czerwony żagiel Kraków, Zielona Sowa 2006, .
 Śląska awangarda. Poeci grupy Kontekst. Katowice, Katowickie Stowarzyszenie Artystyczne 2004, .

External links
 http://www.literackie.pl/autor.asp?idautora=74&lang=

1977 births
People from Jaworzno
Living people
Polish poets